The Committee for Economic Development of Australia (CEDA) is a bipartisan, non-profit organisation providing thought leadership and policy perspectives on the economic and social issues affecting Australia.

Its expressed aim is to "promote national economic development in a sustainable and socially balanced way." Sydney Morning Herald economics editor Ross Gittins has described CEDA as seeking to "inform the public debate without lobbying." It is financed by around 700 members drawn from businesses, universities, governments and community groups and by a program of conferences and other events.

Foundation
CEDA was formed in 1960 by Sir Douglas Copland, one of the most influential figures in Australian economics. George Le Couteur OBE was President from 1968 until 1974. It was modeled on the US CED (Committee for Economic Development) but is now organised along lines more similar to the US Conference Board and the Conference Board of Canada. It is Australia's third-oldest think-tank, after the Institute of Public Affairs and the Australian Institute of International Affairs.

In 1979, after a debate on CEDA's involvement in lobbying, it established a 'Business Roundtable' as an independent entity which in 1983 was merged into the Business Council of Australia.

Research approach
In 2018 CEDA identified its policy stack – technology and data; workplace, workforce and collaboration; population; critical services and institutions. Rather than identifying strongly with a particular ideological viewpoint in the style of the Centre for Independent Studies, the Institute of Public Affairs or the Australia Institute, it mostly offers conclusions that are near the centre of the policy spectrum. It tends to favour market-oriented or at least price-oriented solutions to issues such as water supply and infrastructure.

Recent research
Effects of temporary migration (2019) – examines the role that migrants, specifically temporary migrants, play in Australia's economy and labour market.
Sustainable budgets: underwriting Australia's social compact (2019) – examines priorities to deliver ongoing Federal Budget surpluses and debt reduction. 
Connecting people with progress: securing future economic development (2018) – examines how Australia can realise better social and economic outcomes for Australians in decades to come. 
Community pulse 2018: the economic disconnect (2018) – the results of a CEDA survey, examining community attitudes to economic growth and development.
How unequal? Insights on inequality (2018) – examines key ideas and concepts of inequality, including inequality of opportunity and the future of inequality.
Australia's place in the world (2017) – examines the economic effects felt in Australia from policy decisions which emerge from geopolitical events.
Housing Australia (2017) – examines the issue of housing, trends, drivers of demand and possible policy levers and intergenerational consequences of high housing costs and falling home ownership.
Improving service sector productivity: the economic imperative (2017) – examines the economic consequences of Australia’s productivity performance in the service sector. This report assesses the productivity performance of the sector and discusses policies and areas that can contribute to an improvement in productivity.
Outbound investment (2017) – examines Australia’s outbound investment. The report assesses whether Australia has the right institutional setting to support an outbound focus for business and discuss case studies of successful foreign investments by Australian businesses.
Migration: the economic debate (2016) – examines the economic consequences of the migration program for Australia and the effectiveness of the migration program itself.
VET: skills for growth (2016) – examines the role of Vocational Education and Training (VET) in meeting the skills required for Australia's growth.
Australia's economic future - an agenda for growth (2016) – examines how to repair Australia's economic structures and drive a growth agenda.
Deficit to balance: budget repair options (2016) – examines how Australia can balance the books and repair the budget.
Global networks: transforming how Australia does business (2015) – examines the importance of global connectedness to Australia's future prosperity.
Australia's future workforce (2015) – focuses on what jobs and skills we need to develop to ensure our economy continues to grow and diversify.
The super challenge of retirement income policy (2015) – examines the economic impacts of Australia's ageing population and decreasing housing affordability.
Addressing entrenched disadvantage (2015) – examines the nature and extent of disadvantage, cost and dynamics of disadvantage and ways to address entrenched disadvantage. 
A Federation for the 21st Century (2015) – explores the efficiency of the Australian Federation, duplications between Commonwealth and state responsibilities, and implications for public sector productivity.
Australia's Brisbane Summit challenge: Securing G20's future (2014) – examines the role, effectiveness and processes associated with the G20, specifically looking at the issues of international governance, financial regulation and taxation regulation.
 The Economics of Climate Change (2014) – examines the economic impact of climate change for Australia, explores the responses of other nations and considers what policies will be most effective for Australia to mitigate and adapt to the effects of climate change.
 Advanced Manufacturing: Beyond the production line (2014) – examines where Australia's opportunities for advanced manufacturing lie and how they can play a role in supporting Australia's long-term growth.
 Australia Adjusting: Optimising national prosperity (2013) – explored how Australia can remain competitive into the future. It calls for the establishment of a National Productivity Policy as well as reforms to the taxation system, the Federation, industrial relations policies and education.
 Setting Public Policy (2013) – sets out a practical approach for making meaningful change in public policy. CEDA used its unique relationship with politicians, advocates and policy advisors to draw together practical and personal experience on successful economic reform in Australia.
 Women in Leadership: Understanding the gender gap (2013) – explores a broad range of gender diversity issues including barriers to career progression, the gender pay and participation gap, tax incentives and childcare, workplace diversity, and hidden cultural and unconscious barriers. It makes recommendations on enabling workplace meritocracies, changing workplace culture and engaging leaders and introducing accountability
 Healthcare: Reform or Ration (2013) – explores Australia's biotechnology industry, the skills required to enable healthcare innovation and the fiscal challenges Australia's healthcare system faces. It also provides recommendations for improving the pricing of generic drugs in Australia, potentially saving billions in healthcare spending by government.  
 'Crisis and Opportunity: Lessons of Australian Water Reform' – Australian Water Project, volume 1. This discussion paper, as part of the Australian Water Project, aims to drive debate around water reform to ensure Australia learns from the mistakes of the devastating drought from 1996 to 2009. Volume I draws together 14 contributions from experts to look at different aspects of Australian  water reform including environmental, economic, agricultural and technological water management issues.
 Australia's Nuclear Options (2011) is the first policy perspective in the three part series, Australia's Nuclear Options. It explores nuclear technology and its capacity to assist in meeting Australia's energy requirements in a carbon constrained environment. The publication advocates for future development of nuclear power in Australia and its authors are Barry Brook, Tony Irwin, Tony Wood, Tom Quirk and Anthony Owen. 
 A Taxing Debate: Climate policy beyond Copenhagen (2009) is an 11-chapter volume on the practicalities of a consumption-based carbon tax and its potential to deliver economic and international certainty. It includes papers by Yale University's William D Nordhaus and leading Australian economist Professor Warwick McKibbin.
 Australia's Broadband Future – Four doors to greater competition (2009) offers a competition-based approach to delivering broadband services to customers in different situations across the country.
 Competing From Australia, an eight-paper volume examining Australia's engagement with the world economy. Two papers in Competing From Australia, by Professor Geoffrey Blainey and Professor Glenn Withers, examine the continuing effects of distance on the Australian economy. These papers develop an investigation of the so-called "New Economic Geography" begun in Australia by researchers from the Federal Treasury in the early 2000s. They also revive in a new context the "tyranny of distance" concept made famous by Blainey in the 1960s. Other papers in Competing From Australia examine industrial innovation and the rise of global supply chains.

See also
 Economy of Australia

External links

References

50 Years of CEDA (2010), published by CEDA – the most recent history.
A Taxing Debate: Climate policy beyond Copenhagen (2009).
The Bridge by CEDA Staff (1990), published by CEDA.
Problems & Progress, edited by Harvey Mitchell (1985), published by CEDA – with contributions by Neville Norman, Phil Ruthven, Dame Leonie Kramer and others.
Competing From Australia, published by CEDA (2007)
''The Local Broadband Imperative", by Joshua Gans, published by CEDA (2006)

1960 establishments in Australia
Political and economic think tanks based in Australia
Economic development organizations